Ibn ʿUmran Musa ibn Tubi al-Israʿili Ishbili, also known as Moshe ben Toviah, was a 14th-century Jewish Sevillan Arabic poet. He was the author of a poem in Maghrebi Arabic of didactic character, entitled Al-Sabʿīnīyah. This poem was later translated into Hebrew, under the title Batte ha-Nefesh, by Solomon da Piera. Both the original and the translation were published by Hartwig Hirschfeld in the Annual Report of the Montefiore College (1893–94).

References
 

14th-century Castilian Jews
Medieval Jewish poets
People from Seville
Poets from al-Andalus
Year of death unknown
Year of birth unknown